Liran Serdal (born July 2, 1994) is an Israeli footballer playing for Hapoel Haifa.

References

1994 births
Israeli Jews
Living people
Israeli footballers
Hapoel Haifa F.C. players
Israeli Premier League players
Footballers from Kiryat Motzkin
Israel under-21 international footballers
Association football fullbacks